Piedruja Parish is an administrative unit of Krāslava Municipality, Latvia, named for the town .

Towns, villages and settlements of Piedruja parish 

Parishes of Latvia
Krāslava Municipality